Firuzi may refer to:
 Firuzi, Abadeh, Fars Province
 Firuzi, Bavanat, Fars Province
 Firuzi, Khorrambid, Fars Province
 Firuzi, Marvdasht, Fars Province
 Firuzi, Shiraz, Fars Province
 Firuzi, Razavi Khorasan